Bradley Ryan Elder (born March 17, 1975) is an American professional golfer who has played on the Nationwide Tour and the PGA Tour.

Elder was born in Tulsa, Oklahoma. He got his start in golf from his father. Elder attended the University of Texas and was a member of the golf team. He won the Haskins Award for most outstanding collegiate golfer in 1997, his senior year.

Elder turned professional and debuted on the Nike Tour in 1998. He won two events in that venue in 1999, which allowed him to move up to the PGA Tour. He played on the PGA Tour from 2000 to 2003; his best finishes in that period were T2 at the SEI Pennsylvania Classic in 2000 and a solo 3rd at the Southern Farm Bureau Classic in 2002. He rejoined the Nationwide Tour in 2004. In 2007, he finished in the top-25 on the Nationwide Tour's money list, which included a win at the Preferred Health Systems Wichita Open for the second time. This allowed him to regain his PGA Tour card for 2008, but he did not retain the card, and returned to the Nationwide Tour in 2009.

Amateur wins (2)
this list may be incomplete
1994 Western Junior
1997 Northeast Amateur

Professional wins (3)

Nationwide Tour wins (3)

Results in major championships

Note: Elder only played in the U.S. Open.

CUT = missed the half-way cut
"T" = tied

U.S. national team appearances
Amateur
Palmer Cup: 1997 (winners)
Walker Cup: 1997 (winners)

See also
1999 Nike Tour graduates
2001 PGA Tour Qualifying School graduates
2007 Nationwide Tour graduates

References

External links

American male golfers
Texas Longhorns men's golfers
PGA Tour golfers
Korn Ferry Tour graduates
Golfers from Oklahoma
Golfers from Dallas
Sportspeople from Tulsa, Oklahoma
1975 births
Living people